The Sun-Herald is an Australian newspaper published in tabloid or compact format on Sundays in Sydney by Nine Publishing. It is the Sunday counterpart of The Sydney Morning Herald. In the 6 months to September 2005, The Sun-Herald had a circulation of 515,000. According to the Audit Bureau of Circulations, its circulation had dropped to 443,257  and to 313,477 , from which its management inferred a readership of 868,000. Readership continued to tumble to 264,434 by the end of 2013, and has half the circulation of rival The Sunday Telegraph.

Its predecessor the broadsheet Sunday Herald was published in the years 1949–1953. In 1953, what was then Fairfax Media bought  The Sun, an afternoon paper, and merged its Sunday edition with the Sunday Herald to become the tabloid Sun-Herald.

The Brisbane edition of the Sun-Herald has content from the Brisbane Times.

Liftouts and sections
S – Entertainment and lifestyle
Sunday Life
Travel
Money
Sunday Domain
Sports Sunday
Television – TV listings

Sponsorships
The City2Surf, a 14-kilometre fun run established in 1971, starting from the city of Sydney and concluding at Bondi Beach, is organised by the Sun Herald, which along with Westpac serves as its sponsor.

Digitisation
The paper has been partially digitised as part of the Australian Newspapers Digitisation Program project of the National Library of Australia.

See also 
 List of newspapers in Australia

References

External links
 The Sun-Herald website
 
 

Newspapers published in Sydney
1953 establishments in Australia
Newspapers established in 1953
Newspapers on Trove
Nine Entertainment